Vrgada is an island off the coast of Croatia in the Adriatic Sea. It is located halfway between Zadar and Šibenik, in the archipelago northwest of Murter and south of Biograd na moru,  from the mainland. The only settlement on the island is also named Vrgada and is surrounded with pine forest. Main industries are agriculture and fishing. On northeast coast, there are several small coves.

References 

Islands of Croatia
Islands of the Adriatic Sea
Populated places in Zadar County
Landforms of Zadar County